Aubrey William George Luck (14 November 1900 – 9 June 1999) was an Australian politician. Born in the West Tamar region of Tasmania, he was educated at state schools before becoming a hardware and building merchant in Devonport. He was involved in local politics as a member of Devonport Municipal Council. In 1951, he was elected to the Australian House of Representatives as the Liberal member for Darwin, succeeding the retiring Liberal member Dame Enid Lyons. He held the seat until its abolition in 1955, when he successfully contested the replacement seat of Braddon. He was defeated by Labor candidate Ron Davies in 1958. Luck died in 1999 at the age of 98.

References

Hardware merchants
Liberal Party of Australia members of the Parliament of Australia
Members of the Australian House of Representatives for Darwin
Members of the Australian House of Representatives for Braddon
Members of the Australian House of Representatives
1900 births
1999 deaths
20th-century Australian politicians